Hamre is a village in the municipality of Osterøy in Vestland county, Norway. The village of Hamre is located near the extreme western point on the island of Osterøy, across the Osterfjorden from the village of Knarvik. Hamre village was the administrative centre of the former municipality of Hamre, which existed from 1838 until 1964.

History
Findings from the Stone Age suggest that people have been living in Hamre and the surrounding area for more than 3,500 years. Hamre Church was built in the village in 1622. An inscription on the old main entrance states the church could be dated back to 1585.  There had previously been a stave church at this site dating from about the year 1024. The stave church was demolished when the present church was built. The church was partially rebuilt in 1859 and restored in 1945 and 1949. There is the baptismal font made of soapstone, which is dated from around the year 1250.

References

External links
Hamre kyrkje

Villages in Vestland
Osterøy